The Supreme Court Act (the Act) is an Act passed by the Parliament of Canada which established the Supreme Court of Canada. It was originally passed in 1875 as the Supreme and Exchequer Courts Act.  However, at the time, the Supreme Court was not the supreme authority on Canadian law, as Supreme Court cases could still be appealed to the Judicial Committee of the Privy Council.

The Supreme Court Act is not a part of the Constitution of Canada but rather was merely within Parliament's ability to pass by virtue of section 101 of the Constitution Act, 1867. The Act also was not named as part of the Constitution during patriation in 1982, although the Court itself is mentioned in the amending formula.  As the Court is defined in a regular statute, it may be argued the Court could be abolished by an act of Parliament. However, in their decision in the Reference re Supreme Court Act, ss. 5 and 6, the Court ruled that certain sections of the Act, like its composition, may only be amended using the formula for constitutional amendments, pursuant to s. 41(d) of the Constitution Act, 1982.

Section 53
Section 53 of the Act gives the government the ability to submit reference questions.  This has been controversial as the Constitution Act, 1867 provides for a general court of appeal, but not for a court that may receive reference questions; however, this provision has been upheld as constitutional.

In Reference re Secession of Quebec, the Supreme Court examined the applicability of section 53. The Quebec government argued that the right to secede was an invalid basis for a reference question, but the Court disagreed.

See also
History of the Supreme Court of Canada

Notes and references

Notes

References

External links
Text of the act

Canadian federal legislation
Supreme Court of Canada
1875 in Canadian law